Saint-Job railway station is a railway station in the municipality of Uccle in Brussels, Belgium. The station operated by SNCB/NMBS is located on line 26 between the stations of Boondael and Moensberg. The station is named after the nearby Place de Saint-Job.

Train services
The station is served by the following service(s):

Intercity services (IC-27) (Leuven) - Brussels Airport - Brussels-Luxembourg - St Job - Braine L'alleud - (Nivelles - Charleroi)
Brussels RER services (S5) Mechelen - Brussels-Luxembourg - Etterbeek- St Job  - Halle - Enghien (- Geraardsbergen) (weekdays)
Brussels RER services (S7) Mechelen - Merode - St Job - Halle (weekdays)
Brussels RER services (S9) Leuven - Brussels-Luxembourg - Etterbeek- St Job - Braine-l'Alleud (weekdays, peak hours only)

Connections
The station offers a connection with TEC buses as well as STIB/MIVB tram route 92 and STIB/MIVB bus routes 60 and 37.

References

External links
 

Railway stations in Brussels
Uccle
Railway stations opened in 1973